SEAC (Standards Eastern Automatic Computer or Standards Electronic Automatic Computer)  was a first-generation electronic computer, built in 1950 by the U.S. National Bureau of Standards (NBS) and was initially called the National Bureau of Standards Interim Computer, because it was a small-scale computer designed to be built quickly and put into operation while the NBS waited for more powerful computers to be completed (the DYSEAC). The team that developed SEAC was organized by Samuel N. Alexander. SEAC was demonstrated in April 1950 and was dedicated in June 1950; it is claimed to be the first fully operational stored-program electronic computer in the US.

Description 
Based on EDVAC, SEAC used only 747 vacuum tubes (a small number for the time) eventually expanded to 1,500 tubes. It had 10,500 germanium diodes which performed all of the logic functions (see the article diode–transistor logic for the working principles of diode logic), later expanded to 16,000 diodes. It was the first computer to do most of its logic with solid-state devices. The tubes were used for amplification, inversion and storing information in dynamic flip-flops.
The machine used 64 acoustic delay lines to store 512 words of memory, with each word being 45 bits in size. The clock rate was kept low (1 MHz).

The computer's instruction set consisted of only 11 types of instructions: fixed-point addition, subtraction, multiplication, and division; comparison, and input & output. It eventually expanded to 16 instructions.

The addition time was 864 microseconds and the multiplication time was 2,980 microseconds (i.e. close to 3 milliseconds).

Weight:  (central machine).

Applications

On some occasions SEAC was used by a remote teletype.  This makes it one of the first computers to be used remotely.  With many modifications, it was used until 1964. Some of the problems run on it dealt with:

 digital imaging, led by Russell A. Kirsch
computer animation of the city traffic simulation
 meteorology 
 linear programming
 optical lenses
 a program for Los Alamos National Laboratory
 tables for LORAN navigation
 statistical sampling plans
 wave function of the helium atom
 designing a proton synchrotron

See also
 SWAC (Standards Western Automatic Computer)
 List of vacuum-tube computers
 Manchester Baby

References
 
 Williams, Michael R. (1997). A History of Computing Technology. IEEE Computer Society.
 Metropolis, N; Howlett, J.; Rota, Gian-Carlo (editors) (1980). A History of Computing in the Twentieth Century. Academic Press. (The chapter "Memories of the Bureau of Standards' SEAC", by Ralph J. Slutz.)
 Astin, A. V. (1955), Computer Development (SEAC and DYSEAC) at the National Bureau of Standards, Washington D.C., National Bureau of Standards Circular 551, Issued January 25, 1955, U.S. Government Printing Office. Includes several papers describing SEAC, its technical details, and its operation. In particular, see "SEAC", by S. Greenwald, S. N. Alexander, and Ruth C. Haueter, on pp. 5–26, for an overview of the SEAC system.

Further reading

External links
 SEAC and the Start of Image Processing at the National Bureau of Standards, (Archived) – At the NIST virtual museum
 Margaret R. Fox Papers, 1935-1976, Charles Babbage Institute, University of Minnesota.  collection contains reports, including the original report on the ENIAC, UNIVAC, and many early in-house National Bureau of Standards (NBS) activity reports; memoranda on and histories of SEAC, SWAC, and DYSEAC; programming instructions for the UNIVAC, LARC, and MIDAC; patent evaluations and disclosures; system descriptions; speeches and articles written by Margaret Fox's colleagues; and correspondence of Samuel Alexander, Margaret Fox, and Samuel Williams.  Boxes 6-8 of the Fox papers contain documents, reports, and analysis of the NBS's SEAC.
 SEAC ("Standards Eastern Automatic Computer") (1950) (Archived), from History of Computing: An Encyclopedia of the People and Machines that Made Computer History, Lexikon Services Publishing
 Timeline of Computer History at CHM

One-of-a-kind computers
Vacuum tube computers
1950s computers
Computer-related introductions in 1950
Serial computers